Ava Kuyken (born 15 June 2001) is an English footballer who plays as a midfielder for Hibernian in the Scottish Women's Premier League. An  Arsenal Academy graduate, Kuyken made her 1st team debut age 16 for the 1st team. She went on to make ten appearances for the Gunners, winning the  FA WSL title and Continental Cup medals across the 2017–18 and 2018–19 seasons.

Club career

Arsenal Women Football Club
Kuyken made her competitive debut for Arsenal Women on 16 November 2017 against Watford in the Continental Cup as a substitute in the 80th minute, coming on for Heather O'Reilly. She made her Women's Super League debut on 7 February 2018 against Liverpool as a substitute in the 87th minute, coming on for Jordan Nobbs. She was a regular named squad player throughout the 2017–18 season, when Arsenal won the Continental Cup, progressed to the final of the FA Cup and finished 3rd in the Women's Super League. She made four appearances in her first year with the 1st team.

2018–19 saw another year with the Arsenal Women, alongside competing her A-Level studies at Cherwell School in Oxford. She made her first full debut on 5 December aged 17 with a 5,0 win against Charlton Athletic WFC in the Continental Cup. She made her full debut in the WSL on 27 January 2019 against Reading WFC, in a game they won 3–0. She was a regular named squad member throughout the season making, making 12 appearances in the WSL (7), 3 in the Continental Cup and 2 in the FA Cup. They won the 2018/2019 WSL League and progressed to the Continental Cup Final losing to Manchester City in penalties. She was named as youth player of the year in a round of the year by the Daily Cannon.  Alongside her first team duties Kuyken played with the Arsenal U21 squad. This included the FA Cup, which they won 4–0 against Manchester United.

University of Florida

In August 2019, she took up a college scholarship with the Florida Gators, who compete in Division I of the National Collegiate Athletics Association and the Southeastern Conference. As a freshman, Kuyken was a regular player, being one of only 19 freshman who have started regularly in the program's 25 year history. She made 27 appearances for the Gators and scored one goal.

Bristol City Women
Kuyken played for Bristol City in the FA Women's Championship  in the 2021–2022 season, making 19 appearances for the Robins with 15 of those outings coming in the FA Women’s Championship.

International career

England

Kuyken was selected and played consistently for England through the U15, U16, U17, U18 and U19s youth teams. In 2017–18 the England U17 squad qualified via the elite rounds to the FIFA European finals in Lithuania. Kuyken made full appearances against Spain, Finland and Germany. They progressed to the semi-final, where they were knocked out by Germany. In 2019 with the U18s she played in a friendly games, including against Canada and Scotland. In 2019/2020, she was selected for the UEFA Women's U19 Championship Euros 1st qualifying round in Belarus. They beat Cyprus 8–0 and Belarus 3–0.

Kuyken has dual UK-USA nationality.

References

External links

@AvaKuyken on Twitter

2001 births
Living people
English women's footballers
Women's Super League players
Arsenal W.F.C. players
FA Women's National League players
Women's association football midfielders
Bristol City W.F.C. players
Women's Championship (England) players
Florida Gators women's soccer players
Hibernian W.F.C. players